Dustin Wolf (born April 16, 2001) is an American professional ice hockey goaltender currently playing for the Calgary Wranglers of the American Hockey League (AHL) as a prospect to the Calgary Flames of the National Hockey League (NHL). He was selected in the seventh round of the 2019 NHL Entry Draft, 214th overall, by the Flames.

Playing career
Wolf began his junior career with the Everett Silvertips in the 2017–18 WHL season, serving as the backup goaltender behind the Philadelphia Flyers' then-prospect Carter Hart. Hart earned his second CHL Goaltender of the Year award in 2017–18 but Wolf also played very well, winning 13 of his 20 games with an impressive .928 save percentage.

With Hart graduating from the WHL into the Flyers' professional ranks before the 2018–19 WHL season, Wolf became the Silvertips' starter. He responded in fine form, posting the highest save percentage of any goaltender in the Canadian Hockey League (min. 15 GP) and amassing a 41–15–2 record. Ranked 12th by the league's Central Scouting Bureau among North American goaltenders eligible for the 2019 NHL Entry Draft, Wolf became the 22nd and final goaltender taken when the Calgary Flames selected him in the seventh round, 214th overall.

Wolf posted stellar numbers for Everett in the pandemic-shortened 2019–20 WHL season, winning 34 out of his 46 games and becoming the second Everett goaltender in three years to be named the CHL Goaltender of the Year.

The Flames signed Wolf to a three-year entry-level contract on May 1, 2020. On Oct. 15, 2020, The Athletic named Wolf the fifth-best goaltending prospect affiliated with an NHL team.

Wolf began the 2020–21 season with the Stockton Heat, making his professional debut on February 21, 2021, a 7-1 loss to the Toronto Marlies. Three days later on February 24, 2021, Wolf won his first professional game, making 36 saves in a 4-2 victory against Toronto. With the WHL's U.S. Division beginning play in March, Wolf returned to the Silvertips to open their 2020–21 season. Wolf once again had a remarkable season for Everett, winning a league-high 18 games, as well as being named the WHL Goaltender of the Year for a second consecutive season.

Wolf had a stellar rookie season with the Heat. Wolf recorded 33 wins, was named to the AHL's All-Rookie team, the AHL's First All-Star team, and won the Aldege "Baz" Bastien Memorial Award as the AHL’s most outstanding goaltender. In the 2022 Calder Cup playoffs, Wolf became the third goaltender in AHL history to record three shutouts in a single playoff series, in the Pacific Division Finals against the Colorado Eagles.

International play

On Dec. 23, 2019, USA Hockey announced that Wolf had been named to Team USA for the 2020 World Junior Ice Hockey Championships in the Czech Republic. Wolf played one game in the tournament: a round-robin match against Germany, in which he made 17 saves on 20 shots en route to a 6–3 USA victory.

In advance of the pandemic-delayed 2020–21 hockey seasons for both the NHL and the WHL, Wolf was again named to the Team USA roster for the 2021 World Junior Ice Hockey Championships. On Dec. 26, 2020, Wolf recorded his first career World Junior shutout, making 10 saves during Team USA's 11–0 win over Austria.

Career statistics

Regular season and playoffs

International

Awards and honors

References

External links

 

2001 births
Living people
American men's ice hockey goaltenders
Sportspeople from California
Ice hockey players from Connecticut
Calgary Flames draft picks
Calgary Wranglers players
Everett Silvertips players
People from Gilroy, California
Stockton Heat players